A police tactical unit (PTU) is a specialized police unit trained and equipped to handle situations that are beyond the capabilities of ordinary law enforcement units because of the level of violence (or risk of violence) involved. A police tactical unit's tasks may include: executing dangerous search warrants and arrest warrants for dangerous persons; arresting or neutralizing dangerous or mentally ill armed persons; and intervening in high risk situations such as shootouts, or hostage and terrorist incidents.

Definition

Police tactical units are dedicated units composed of personnel selected and trained in tactical skillsets to carry out the responsibilities of the unit, and in use of force policies, including lethal force for counter-terrorism. A PTU is equipped with specialized police and military-type equipment. PTU personnel may also be trained in crisis negotiation skills.

A PTU can be part of either:
 a police force under the authority of civilian officials; or 
 a Gendarmerie-style police force under the authority of civilian officials (Interior Ministry) and/or the Defence Ministry, that may have formal military status. 

Other government agencies, depending on the country, may establish specialized units with comparable taskings, training and equipment, such as the border guard, coast guard, customs, or corrections.

In the United States, police tactical units are known by the generic term of Special Weapons And Tactics (SWAT) teams; the term originated from the Los Angeles Police Department. In Australia, the federal government uses the term police tactical group. The European Union uses the term special intervention unit for national counter-terrorist PTUs.

Characteristics

Police tactical units have similarities to military special forces units such as organization, selection, training, equipment, and operational methodologies.

For "certain counter terrorism operations, such as hostage rescue, there is a significant convergence of roles, tactics and force when employed in either an armed conflict or policing role". Aside from counter-terrorism, the roles of police and military units differ in that the role of military units can result in the use of the maximum permissible force against enemy combatants while the role of police units is to use only minimal force sufficient to subdue suspected criminals, including negotiation.

See also 
 List of police tactical units

Notes

References

Further reading

External links